Bab Abdan (also Romanized as Bāb ‘Abdān) is a village in Toghrol Al Jerd Rural District, Toghrol Al Jerd District, Kuhbanan County, Kerman Province, Iran. At the 2006 census, its population was 182, in 46 families.

References 

Populated places in Kuhbanan County